Kwok Fung (born 27 October 1951 in Hong Kong) is a veteran actor from Hong Kong. He graduated the first training of TVB in 1971.

Filmography

Film
 S Storm (2016)
 Raging Fire (2021)

Television

References
Official website

TVB veteran actors
Living people
1951 births